Richard Ferris Muth (May 14, 1927 – April 10, 2018) was an American economist, who is considered to be one of the founders of urban economics (along with William Alonso and Edwin Mills).

Muth obtained his Ph.D. from the University of Chicago in 1958, with a thesis on non-farm housing demand.

References

External links 
 Website at Emory University

1927 births
2018 deaths
Economists from Illinois
People from Chicago
University of Chicago alumni
Emory University faculty
Regional economists
Washington University in St. Louis alumni